Carl Warner (born 1963) is a British artist, director, author and photographer. Warner blends photography and art to make highly conceptual visual images. Based in London, Warner's 25-year career spans still life, advertising and photography. He is best known for his intricate food landscapes where he uses different types of foods and ingredients. He aims to inspire people to look at food in different ways. He is also known for his Bodyscapes.

Early life and education 
Carl Warner was born in Liverpool, England in 1963. At the age of seven he moved to Kent with his parents and as an only child spent hours in his bedroom listening to music, drawing and creating worlds from his imagination, inspired by the posters on his walls by artists such as Salvador Dali and Patrick Woodroofe and the record sleeve designs of Roger Dean and the work of Hipgnosis.

Carl began his career by going to Maidstone College of Art with a view to becoming an illustrator as he had a good talent for drawing, but he quickly discovered that his ideas and creative eye was better suited to photography as he saw it as a faster and more exciting medium in which to work. After a year’s foundation course at the college he moved to the London College of Printing in 1982 to do a three year degree course in photography, film and television.

In 1985 he left to become assistant to David Lowe, a photographer based in Knightsbridge, London, where he first met art directors, model makers and retouchers who created images for the advertising industry. After a year of assisting he set up a studio next to David and began working for ad agencies, design groups and PR houses. Although a very keen landscape photographer he initially established himself as a still life photographer, and then began to branch out into other areas of photography in the advertising world, shooting people and landscapes for a wide variety of products and brands.

Having become a successful advertising photographer from the mid to late 80′s through to the mid nineties he found that his work was becoming less in demand as well as unfulfilling creatively. He was searching for a something new and different to do with his talent that would not only rekindle his interest in photography but inject some life into his flagging business. Inspiration seemed hard to find, but one day while walking around a food market he found some wonderful portabello mushrooms which he thought looked like some kind of tree from an alien world. So he took them back to his studio with a few other ingredients such as rice seeds and beans with a view to try and create a miniature scene on a table top.

The Mushroom Savanna became his first “Foodscape” and over the next ten years he continued to develop a body of work making landscapes out of food, and this began to attract the advertising industry once again who began commissioning him for advertising campaigns for various food based products and brands.

In January of 2008 this work was featured in an article the Sunday Times, after which the flood gates opened to a host of media attention from magazines and newspapers all over the world, and this led to television reports, documentaries and interviews, including an appearance on Britain’s famous Richard and Judy Show. The publishing of the images on TV and newspaper websites also led to the creation of many pdf format viral emails which are still to this day being passed around the globe. These viral emails have led to a recognition of his work throughout the world, which has resulted in a book deal with a major U.S. publisher, the licensing of images for merchandising opportunities, as well as advertising campaigns and commissions from some of the biggest brand names in the food world. Some of these campaigns have helped Carl to expand his work into the moving image where he has begun directing television and internet commercials.

His first book “Carl Warner’s Food Landscapes” catalogues many of his early works, where he writes about their inspiration and shows the process of their creation from the initial sketches through to the building and shooting, with “behind the scenes” pictures and ingredient lists. The book is an informative and amusing insight into Carl’s work which reveals many of the secrets, tricks and techniques he uses in the creation of his images.

His second book “A World of Food” is a children’s book featuring scenes made from predominantly one colour. Carl has written poems to accompany each image which describe and annotate the scenes so that children can discover the ingredients for themselves. Carl’s hope is that his work might be used to alter children’s perception of food and to encourage them to develop a greater insight to healthy eating and nutritional education.

The Work

The ‘Foodscapes’ are created in Carl’s London studio where they are built on top of a large purpose built triangular table top. The scenes are photographed in layers from foreground to background and sky as the process is very time consuming and so the food quickly wilts under the lights. Each element is then put together in post production to achieve the final image.

“Although I’m very hands on with my work, I do use model makers and food stylists to help me create the sets. I tend to start with a drawing which I sketch out in order to get the composition worked out, this acts as a blue print for the team to work to.”

Once the drawing is agreed upon, Carl then works out what each part of the scene will be made from, and working with his food stylist they together determine the best ingredients to work with in order to achieve his aims.

“I tend to draw a very conventional landscape using classic compositional techniques as I need to fool the viewer into thinking it is a real scene at first glance, it is the realisation that the scene is in fact made of food that brings a smile that brings a smile to the viewer, and for me that’s the best part”

Having worked for many years as a photographer bringing ideas to life for advertising agencies Carl became very experienced in lighting, and especially the recreation of natural looking light using a combination of tungsten and flash lighting equipment.

“I’ve always enjoyed the discipline of working in the studio, and the spontaneity of working outdoors in natural light, as you never know what you’re going to get. With my ‘Foodscapes’ I can now put together the knowledge of natural light with the control of recreating it in the studio in order to bring out the colours and textures as well as the beauty of a scene”

These images can take up to two or three days to build and photograph and then a couple of days retouching and fine tuning the images to blend all the elements together. Carl spends a lot of time planning each image before shooting in order to choose the best ingredients to replicate larger scale shapes and forms within nature, so he spends a lot of time staring at vegetables in supermarkets which makes him seem a little odd! However, he is careful to point out that finding the right shaped broccoli to use as a tree is an all important task.

“Although there is a fair amount of waste, there is a lot of food left over which is always shared out with the team, though most of the food used in the sets have either been super glued or pinned and none of this makes for good eating!”

Artist

Foodscapes
After his success on the internet creating food art images, he began to make more elaborate works, often made to look like famous landmarks, and always made out of real food. The goal of these projects is to trick the human eye into thinking the scene is real at first glance, and Warner uses anything from fresh vegetables and fruits to bread, cheese, and sometimes meat and fish, as well as Tungsten lights in order to create the appearance of sunlight. These elaborate Foodscapes are his most popular work and he often gets hired to create them for large food production companies.

Bodyscapes
Warner's more recent Bodyscapes is a series of bodyscapes which repeat body parts in a pattern that creates the illusion of a landscape. This piece is meant to redefine portraiture by focusing on the importance of every part of our bodies. Warner creates these portraits by photographing the body parts individually and editing them together in order to create a landscape effect.

Pizzascapes
Warner created Pizzascapes as a promotional project for DiGiorno Pizza. The project includes 20 different artworks depicting pizzas in scenes relevant to the pizza toppings, such as a pineapple pizza appearing to be in an island landscape. The backgrounds of these images were created out of a combination of figurines and food; many depict tiny people assembling or interacting with the pizzas.

Director

Television advertisements 
Warner has set up his own production company known as Frooty Films in June 2014. Within the company he has directed and created television commercials for Nestlé, Honey Nut Cheerios, Moe's Southwest Grill and the Milan EXPO 2015.

The Milan Expo in 2015 focused on Feeding the planet. UK Trade and Investment partnered with Warner to display the UK's impact in global agriculture innovation. Warner created a series of animations using beans, rice, coffee and maize to illustrate the UK's global solutions to feeding the planet. His commercial was titled Resilient Rice.

Warner has closely collaborated with Moe's Southwest Grill to create new augmented reality foodscapes made with Moe's fresh ingredients. 

Furthermore, Warner is developing an educational TV program for children including characters made out of healthy food, with the purpose of encouraging healthy eating for children.

Photographer 
Most of Warner's work has been in advertising. Warner is considered more of a photographic illustrator who creates and transforms one thing into another using composition and lighting.
The scenes are photographed in layers from foreground to background. The process is time consuming and the food quickly wilts under the lights. Each element is then put together in post production to achieve the final image.

Other worlds 

The goal with Warner's other world photography is to use objects that people would not normally take the time to look at. Warner finds beauty in the mundane and the banal, in creating landscapes from the contents of a fridge or building cities from sea shells or car parts.

Still life 
Through his own studio Warner created still life photography for Nestlé, Unilever, Hugo Boss, and Whiskas.

Published works

Carl Warner's Food Landscapes 
Food Landscapes was published in 2010 by Harry N. Abrams in New York. The book collects Warner's early works spanning from 1998. It shows behind the scenes images of Warner and his team assembling the structures. It covers details of what inspired each Foodscape and how each was created from initial sketches through to the ingredients used in the photography.

A World of Food: Discover Magical Lands Made of Things You Can Eat! 
Warner's second book, A World of Food, is a children's book published in 2012 by Harry N. Abrams. Each Foodscape is composed primarily of a single color and is accompanied by poems written by Warner. Each image is composed entirely from foods from around the world. With this book, Warner hopes to alter children's perception of food and educate them about healthy eating and nutrition.

References 

1963 births
Living people
Photographers from Kent